Vojo Gardašević (born 10 October 1940) is a Montenegrin former association football coach and former player.

Playing career
Gardašević started his career with hometown club Budućnost, with whom he reached (and lost) the 1965 Yugoslav Cup final against Dinamo Zagreb. Budućnost were in the second league at the time and after losing the cup final, they also missed out on promotion to the top tier.

He later played club football in the Netherlands for PEC Zwolle.

Managerial career
Gardašević has coached the national teams of Iraq, Kenya, and the Seychelles.

References

1940 births
Living people
Footballers from Podgorica
Association football defenders
Yugoslav footballers
FK Budućnost Podgorica players
FK Sutjeska Nikšić players
PEC Zwolle players
Yugoslav Second League players
Yugoslav First League players
Tweede Divisie players
Yugoslav expatriate footballers
Expatriate footballers in the Netherlands
Yugoslav expatriate sportspeople in the Netherlands
Yugoslav football managers
FK Zeta managers
Al-Quwa Al-Jawiya managers
Iraq national football team managers
Expatriate football managers in Iraq
Serbia and Montenegro football managers
Kenya national football team managers
Gor Mahia F.C. managers
Seychelles national football team managers
Eritrea national football team managers
Expatriate football managers in Kenya
Expatriate football managers in Seychelles
Expatriate football managers in Eritrea
Montenegrin football managers